Fremont School District can refer to:
 Fremont Unified School District
 Fremont Union High School District
 Fremont RE-2 School District
 Fremont Community School District - Iowa